Cirrhimuraena is a genus of eels in the snake eel family Ophichthidae.

Species
There are currently 10 recognized species in this genus:

 Cirrhimuraena calamus (Günther, 1870)
 Cirrhimuraena cheilopogon (Bleeker, 1860)
 Cirrhimuraena chinensis Kaup, 1856
 Cirrhimuraena inhacae (J. L. B. Smith, 1962) (Inhaca fringelip)
 Cirrhimuraena oliveri (Seale, 1910)
 Cirrhimuraena orientalis K. H. Nguyen, 1993
 Cirrhimuraena paucidens Herre & G. S. Myers, 1931
 Cirrhimuraena playfairii (Günther, 1870) (Fringelip snake-eel)
 Cirrhimuraena tapeinoptera (Bleeker, 1863
 Cirrhimuraena yuanding W. Q. Tang & C. G. Zhang, 2003

References

Ophichthidae